Fred Hirsch may refer to:

 Fred Hirsch (economist) (1931–1978), professor of international studies at the University of Warwick
 Fred Hirsch (entrepreneur) (1888–1979), American naturopath, entrepreneur, salesman, and author